Widnica is a village in the administrative district of Gmina Miechów, within Miechów County, Lesser Poland Voivodeship, in southern Poland.

In 2011, it had a population of 146.

References

Villages in Miechów County